"Welcome Me Love" is a 1969 song by The Brooklyn Bridge. It was issued as the B-side of "Blessed Is the Rain," (Canada #48, U.S. #45) but became a double-sided hit.

As "Blessed Is the Rain" descended the charts, "Welcome Me Love", garnered enough airplay to become an equal-sized hit.  It reached number 48 U.S. Billboard and number 47 on Cash Box. In Canada, it definitively became the bigger hit, spending two weeks at number 38.

Internationally, "Welcome Me Love" was then re-issued as the A-side, still backed with "Blessed is the Rain."

Chart history

References

External links
 

1969 singles
1969 songs
Johnny Maestro songs
Songs written by Tony Romeo
Buddah Records singles
Song recordings produced by Wes Farrell